Juncus bufonius, known commonly as toad rush, is a widespread flowering plant species complex in the rush family Juncaceae.

Distribution
Its native range is circumpolar throughout tropical, subtropical, subarctic, and temperate climate areas of the Northern Hemisphere and Southern Hemisphere.
 
It is also widely distributed as an introduced species in suitable habitats worldwide.  It grows in moist and muddy places, often in wetlands and riparian areas.

In habitats where it is not native and has naturalized it may be considered a weed. The relationship of North America plants to the Eurasian Juncus ranarius is weakly delineated.

Description
Juncus bufonius is an annual monocot that is quite variable in appearance.    It is generally a green clumping grasslike rush, with many thin stems wrapped with few threadlike leaves.

The flowers are borne in inflorescences and also in the joint where the inflorescence branches off of the stem. It is a grassy flower folded within tough bracts and sepals. The blooming period is March through May.

Varieties
Varieties include:
Juncus bufonius var. bufonius — North America.
Juncus bufonius var. congestus  — North America.
Juncus bufonius var. occidentalis  — North America.
Juncus bufonius var. rechingeri — South Asia.

References

External links
  Calflora Database: Juncus bufonius (Toad rush)
Jepson Manual eFlora (TJM2) treatment of Juncus bufonius

bufonius
Flora of Africa
Flora of Asia
Flora of Europe
Flora of North America
Flora of South America
Flora of the subantarctic islands
Freshwater plants
Plants described in 1753
Taxa named by Carl Linnaeus